Kele people may refer to:
 Kele people (Congo), a Bantu ethnic group
 Kele people (Gabon)
 Kele people (Nigeria), a Cross River ethnic group